The North 21st Street Bridge in Tacoma, Washington was built in 1910. It was designed by engineers Waddell & Harrington and is a continuous concrete rigid-frame girder bridge. It is significant as one of the very earliest examples of its type. It was built "almost simultaneously" with the  Asylum Avenue Aqueduct in Knoxville, Tennessee, which was documented by Carl W. Condit to be the first continuous concrete girder bridge to be built.

It has three  reinforced concrete spans with four continuous girders. Its spans are supported by reinforced concrete columns and abutments.

The bridge was listed on the National Register of Historic Places in 1982.

See also
List of bridges documented by the Historic American Engineering Record in Washington (state)
List of bridges on the National Register of Historic Places in Washington (state)
North 23rd Street Bridge, similar, nearby, narrower, longer, also designed by Waddell & Harrington, and also NRHP-listed

References

External links

Bridges in Tacoma, Washington
Concrete bridges in the United States
Girder bridges in the United States
Historic American Engineering Record in Washington (state)
National Register of Historic Places in Tacoma, Washington
Road bridges on the National Register of Historic Places in Washington (state)